Donald Jay Gaetz (born January 22, 1948) is a Republican politician who served as a member of the Florida State Senate from 2006 to 2016, representing parts of Northwest Florida. He was Senate president from 2012 to 2014. He is the father of Congressman Matt Gaetz.

Early life and career
Gaetz was born in Rugby, North Dakota, the son of Olive (Knutson) and Jerry Gaetz, a former mayor of the city and a state legislator. Jerry Gaetz was a candidate for Lieutenant Governor of North Dakota at the 1964 North Dakota Republican Party state convention, where he died of a heart attack while his son watched television coverage of the event.

Gaetz attended the Evangelical Lutheran-affiliated Concordia College, graduating with his bachelor's degree in religion and political science, and then Troy State University, receiving his Master of Public Administration in education before moving to the state of Florida in 1978.

Career
Shortly after receiving his Master's degree, Gaetz worked in Jacksonville as a hospital administrator, and lobbied the legislature to create hospice care programs for the dying. In 1983, Gaetz founded VITAS Healthcare Corporation with a group of investors, which he later sold for nearly half a billion dollars in 2004.

Okaloosa County School Board
In 1994, Gaetz ran for the Okaloosa County School Board, receiving the Republican nomination and then challenging incumbent school board member Jean Long, the Democratic nominee, and Susan Matuska, the Libertarian nominee, in the general election. He ended up winning in a landslide, receiving 69% of the vote to Long's 20% and Matuska's 11%.

During his first term, Gaetz campaigned for a one-cent sales tax to fund school construction and renovation, which was easily approved by the county's voters in a 1995 special election.

In 1997, he called for an investigation into the conduct of a vice-principal at Niceville High School, where his son went to school, after reports surfaced of the vice-principal promoting his religious beliefs while working at the school. Following his call for an investigation, which he said was warranted by the vice-principal's attempts "to make people who didn't share his views feel as though they were somehow second-class Christians or that they were in danger of damnation," he said, "I have received death threats from individuals who mistakenly believe the way to advance their own particular brand of Christianity is to threaten the life of someone who is a Christian not of their particular kind."

When he ran for re-election in 1998, Gaetz was opposed by only Republican candidate James Campbell, whom he defeated in an open primary with 67% of the vote.

Gaetz opted to run for Okaloosa County superintendent of schools in 2000, and faced David Morgan, the principal of Niceville High School, in the Republican primary. He defeated Morgan handily, winning 68% of the vote and advancing to the general election, where he was opposed by William Lynch, the Democratic nominee, and John Hughes, an independent candidate. Neither Lynch nor Hughes posed a significant challenge to Gaetz, and he won his first term with 75% of the vote to Lynch's 18% and Hughes' 7%. He was unopposed for re-election in 2004. During his time as superintendent, the Okaloosa County School District increased from twenty-seventh in the state in student performance to first.

Florida Senate
When incumbent state senator Charlie Clary was unable to seek re-election in 2006 due to term limits, Gaetz ran to succeed him in the 4th District, which stretched from Pensacola to Panama City, including parts of southern Bay County, Escambia County, Okaloosa County, Santa Rosa County, and Walton County. He was initially set to face state representative Holly Benson in the Republican primary, but Benson ultimately declined to run, and Gaetz won the nomination, and then the general election, unopposed.

During his first term in the Senate, Gaetz served as Chairman of the Senate Education Committee and attracted headlines when he attacked a Florida Department of Education official over a teacher bonus initiative. Gaetz sponsored legislation that would have expanded Florida Comprehensive Assessment Test material to include social studies, broadened the group of people determining state standards, granted honors diplomas to high-achieving test takers, and taught world languages in elementary schools. He was re-elected without opposition in 2010.

In 2012, following the reconfiguration of the state's legislative districts, Gaetz was drawn into the 1st District, which included much of the territory that he had previously represented but dropped the extension into Pensacola for an inclusion of Holmes County, Jackson County, and Washington County. He won the Republican nomination uncontested; in the general election he faced independent candidate Richard Harrison. Gaetz campaigned on his grassroots efforts to introduce himself to potentially new constituents in the district and attacked his opponent for his "misunderstanding of the legislative process." Ultimately, Gaetz was re-elected in a landslide, winning 74% of the vote to Harrison's 26%.

Gaetz served as the president of the Florida Senate from 2012–2014.

Gaetz received a 100% rating from the National Rifle Association.

Stephen Alford
Florida businessman Stephen Alford pleaded guilty in a $25 million extortion plot targeting Don Gaetz in a convoluted scheme to secure a presidential pardon for Gaetz's son, Matt, who came under investigation regarding allegations of sex trafficking. Alford later told investigators that he lied to the Gaetz's about the pardon.

On August 22, 2022, U.S. District Judge Casey Rodgers sentenced Alford (aged 62) to 63 months plus three years supervised release after he pleaded guilty in 2021 to one count of wire fraud.

Fraud lawsuit

In 2013, the U.S. Department of Justice filed a lawsuit against VITAS for allegedly committing Medicare fraud since 2002, when Gaetz still worked at the company. Gaetz denied any role in any wrongdoing that occurred. The case was settled in January 2018 with a confidential settlement.

Personal life
Gaetz and his wife, Victoria (née Quertermous) reside in Seaside, Florida, in a house that was used in the film The Truman Show; a sign on their white picket fence says "the Truman house". Gaetz has two children; his son, Matt Gaetz, currently serves as a member of the U.S. House of Representatives, and his daughter, Erin, was director of digital content for Jeb Bush's 2016 presidential campaign.

References

External links

Florida Senate - Don Gaetz

|-

|-

1948 births
Living people
School board members in Florida
Presidents of the Florida Senate
Republican Party Florida state senators
People from Okaloosa County, Florida
American people of Norwegian descent
American Lutherans
Troy University alumni
Concordia College (Moorhead, Minnesota) alumni
People from Rugby, North Dakota